Gruney or Grunay is the name of several Shetland Islands. It derives from the Old Norse for "green island".

Usual uses
 Gruney off Northmavine
 Grunay, in the Out Skerries

Other uses
 Gruna off Vementry
 Gruney, one of the Ramna Stacks, a special protection area for birds
 Haaf Gruney by Unst
 Sound Gruney by Unst

See also
 List of islands called Green Holm
 Green Island (disambiguation)
 Green Isle (disambiguation)
 Greena